The delimitative aspect is a grammatical aspect that indicates that a situation lasts only a certain amount of time. It is sometimes called durative aspect. Polish: stałem i gadałem – "I stood and chatted" compared with postałem i pogadałem = "I stood and chatted for a while" (the prefix po- marking the delimitative aspect in this example).

Delimitative aspect in Chinese is often marked by reduplication of the verb. For details see Chinese grammar§Aspects.

References

Grammatical aspects
Russian grammar